CICV-FM was a community radio station that broadcasts on the frequency 98.7 FM in Lake Cowichan, British Columbia, Canada.

Owned by Cowichan Valley Community Radio Society, the station was licensed by the CRTC on April 15, 2009.

The station signed on in August 2009.

On August 9, 2012, Cowichan Valley Community Radio Society received an approval from the CRTC to operate a new low-power FM radio station at Lake Cowichan. The new station would operate at 97.5 MHz with 5 watts. On December 31, 2017, CICV-FM closed its doors due to financial hardship and lack of volunteer support in the community.

References

External links
Cowichan Valley Community Radio
Cowichan Valley Arts Council
 

ICV
ICV
Radio stations established in 2009
2009 establishments in British Columbia
2017 disestablishments in British Columbia
Radio stations disestablished in 2017
ICV
ICV